Alexandra Boltasseva is Ron And Dotty Garvin Tonjes Professor of electrical and computer engineering at Purdue University, and editor-in-chief for The Optical Society's Optical Materials Express journal. Her research focuses on plasmonic metamaterials, manmade composites of metals that use surface plasmons to achieve optical properties not seen in nature.

Education and Career 
Boltasseva studied her bachelor and masters in physics at the Moscow Institute of Physics and Technology, completing her research projects on quantum-well lasers at the Lebedev Physical Institute. She moved to the Technical University of Denmark for her PhD studies in nanophotonics and nanofabrication, working with Sergey I. Bozhevolnyi. Following her PhD, Boltasseva worked at two photonics start-up companies before returning to the Technical University of Denmark as a postdoc and subsequently an associate professor. In 2008 she moved to Purdue University and is currently the Ron And Dotty Garvin Tonjes Professor of Electrical and Computer Engineering, as well as holding a courtesy appointment in Materials Engineering.

Research 
Prof. A. Boltasseva’s team specializes in nano- and quantum photonics, plasmonics, optical metamaterials, optical materials, and nanofabrication. The central theme of Boltasseva’s research is finding new ways for the discovery, realization, and machine-learning-assisted optimization of nanophotonic structures - from material growth to advanced photonic designs and device demonstrations. Prof. Boltasseva’s team aims at developing new platforms to unlock properties of nanophotonic structures in previously unavailable designs and wavelength regimes and to enable new generations of low-loss, tunable, reconfigurable, semiconductor-compatible devices for applications in on-chip circuitry, information processing, data recording/storage, sensing, medical imaging and therapy, energy conversion and quantum information technologies.

Awards, honors, memberships
A. Boltasseva's research earned her a number of awards:

• In 2021, for the second consecutive year named in The Highly Cited Researchers™ list by Clarivate™.

• 2020 Fellow of the National Academy of Inventors (NAI)

• 2019 Fellow of the Institute of Electrical and Electronics Engineers (IEEE) 

• 2018 Blavatnik National Award for Young Scientists Finalist

• 2017 Fellow of The International Society For Optics And Photonic (SPIE)

• 2008 Young Elite-Researcher Award from the Danish Councils for Independent Research

Optical Society 
Boltasseva was assigned as editor-in-chief for The Optical Society's Optical Materials Express journal in 2016, taking over the role from David J. Hagan, founding editor-in-chief.

References 

Living people
American electrical engineers
American computer scientists
Purdue University faculty
American women engineers
American women computer scientists
20th-century American engineers
20th-century women engineers
21st-century American engineers
21st-century women engineers
Fellows of Optica (society)
Moscow Institute of Physics and Technology alumni
1978 births
20th-century American scientists
20th-century American women scientists
21st-century American scientists
21st-century American women scientists
Women in optics
Russian emigrants to the United States
People from Chuvashia
American women academics